Prairie Stranger is a 1941 American Western film directed by Lambert Hillyer and written by Winston Miller. It is based on the 1936 novel The Medico Rides the Trail by James L. Rubel. The film stars Charles Starrett, Cliff Edwards, Patti McCarty, Forbes Murray, Frank LaRue and Archie R. Twitchell. The film was released on September 18, 1941, by Columbia Pictures.

Plot

Cast          
Charles Starrett as Steven Monroe
Cliff Edwards as 'Bones' Mallory
Patti McCarty as Sue Evans
Forbes Murray as Jud Evans
Frank LaRue as Jim Dawson
Archie R. Twitchell as Barton
Francis Walker as Craig
Edmund Cobb as Dr. Westridge
Jim Corey as Undertaker 
Russ Powell as Whittling Jones
Lew Preston as Lew Preston
Lopez Willingham as Ranch Hand

References

External links
 

1941 films
American Western (genre) films
1941 Western (genre) films
Columbia Pictures films
Films directed by Lambert Hillyer
American black-and-white films
1940s English-language films
1940s American films